Billa No. 786 is a 2000 Indian Hindi-language action drama film directed by Imran Khalid and produced by Salim Khan. The movie was released on 29 December 2000 under the banner of Tirupati Enterprises. Mithun Chakraborty played the lead role.

Plot
Shankar is a coolie at a bus stop. He fights for the down-trodden and stands up against evil forces. Local goon Dhankeshwar has set his eyes on the slum where the coolies live. Shankar fights against the villains.

Cast
 Mithun Chakraborty as Shankar
 Gajendra Chouhan as Virendra Singh (Pinky's dad)
 Siddharth Dhawan as Sidhu
 Mohan Joshi as Pyaremohan Dhankeshwar
 Kader Khan	
 Harish Patel
 Shiva Rindani as Kaalu Tagda (as Shiva)
 Tej Sapru as Kaalu Ragda
 Anil Nagrath as Roopchand
 Rutika Singh as Pinky Singh
 Sudhir as Balwant Rai
 Kavita as Lajjo

Soundtracks

References

External links

Full Hyderabad review

2000 films
2000s Hindi-language films
Mithun's Dream Factory films
Films shot in Ooty
Indian action drama films